Genoplesium anthracinum, commonly known as the black midge orchid is a species of small terrestrial orchid endemic to New South Wales. It has a single thin leaf fused to the flowering stem and up to thirty small, coal black flowers. It grows in heath in coastal and near-coastal parts of the Northern Rivers area.

Description
There is a callus in the centre of the labellum and extending nearly to its tip. Flowering occurs in April and May.

Taxonomy and naming
The black midge orchid was first formally described in 2006 by David Jones who gave it the name Corunastylis anthracina and published the description in Australian Orchid Research. In 2014, Julian Shaw changed the name to Genoplesium anthracinum.  The specific epithet (anthracinum) means "coal black".

Distribution and habitat
Genoplesium anthracinum grows in heath, often colonising disturbed sites and is found between Byron Bay and Wardell.

References

External links

anthracinum
Endemic orchids of Australia
Orchids of New South Wales
Plants described in 2006